The 36th Hong Kong Film Awards presentation ceremony took place at Hong Kong Cultural Centre on 9 April 2017.

Winners and nominees 
Winners are listed first, highlighted in boldface, and indicated with a double dagger.

References

External links
 Official website of the Hong Kong Film Awards
 Hong Kong Film Awards 2017 University of Hong Kong Library

2017
2016 film awards
2017 in Hong Kong
Hong